Chermaly′k is a village in Mariupol Raion (district) in Donetsk Oblast (province) of eastern Ukraine, near the northern banks of the Sea of Azov. Chermalyk is situated at 39.3 km south from the centre of Donetsk city, in some 40 km from Mariupol on the left bank of the Kalmius river.

Demographics
Native language as of the Ukrainian Census of 2001:
 Russian 82.91%
Ukrainian 8.33%
Greek 8.54%

References

External links
 Site of village Chermalyk.
 Satellite map of Chermalyk In Ukraine

Yekaterinoslav Governorate
Villages in Mariupol Raion